Lewis Christopher Woodroffe (29 October 1921 – June 2015) was an English professional footballer. He played at inside or outside forward.

Born in Portsmouth in October 1921, his early adult life coincided with the Second World War, at a time when professional football competitions such as the Football League and FA Cup were suspended. He joined Manchester City as a professional in October 1945, and in the 1946–47 season he played and scored for the club in the Second Division. However, he was released on a free transfer at the end of the season, and joined Watford, of the Third Division South. He played 64 matches in all competitions for the side, scoring 6 goals, before leaving on a free transfer at the end of the 1950–51 season. He later played for Canterbury City, who at the time were playing in the Kent League.

References 

1921 births
2015 deaths
Canterbury City F.C. players
English Football League players
English footballers
Manchester City F.C. players
Footballers from Portsmouth
Watford F.C. players
Association football forwards
British Army personnel of World War II